Rasmus Seebach (born 28 March 1980) is a Danish singer-songwriter and record producer who had his solo-debut with the Danish-language single "Engel" in April 2009.

Seebach has written and produced songs for Danish and international artists since the late 1990s. Together with his brother, Nicolai Seebach, he runs the production company Top Notch Music. The two wrote the music for the charity song "Hvor små vi er" for the victims of the 2004 Indian Ocean earthquake and tsunami.

His self-titled debut album consists of 12 tracks and was released on 28 September 2009, containing among others the singles "Engel" and "Glad igen".

Rasmus Seebach is a son of Tommy Seebach, about whom he has also written a song, namely "Den jeg er". In the song, Rasmus tells his father that they have forgiven him and are doing fine, despite the father's alcoholism and sudden death. His brother Nicolai Seebach is also a well-known musician, songwriter and producer who co-writes most of Rasmus' materials.

In 2012 he recorded a duet version of "Say You, Say Me" with Lionel Richie which was featured on Richie's album Tuskegee.

Discography

Albums 
As G-Bach
1999: Skakmat
Solo

EPs

Singles

In Scandinavian countries

Other countries

Featured in

Other charted songs

References

External links 

 Rasmus Seebach Official website
 Rasmus Seebach on MySpace

1980 births
Living people
Danish record producers
Danish male singer-songwriters
Singers from Copenhagen
21st-century Danish male singers
MTV Europe Music Award winners